Judo, for the 2013 Bolivarian Games, took place from 17 November to 20 November 2013.

Medal table
Key:

Medal summary

Men

Women

References

External links
 

Events at the 2013 Bolivarian Games
2013
Bolivarian Games